The 2012 Hong Kong Legislative Council election was held on 9 September 2012 for the 5th Legislative Council (LegCo) since the establishment of the Hong Kong Special Administrative Region.

The election was for the new total of 70 seats in LegCo, ten more than previously, with 35 members elected in geographical constituencies through direct elections, and 35 members in functional constituencies. Under new arrangements agreed in a contentious LegCo vote in 2010, five District Council (Second) functional constituency seats each represent all 18 District Councils of Hong Kong voted for by all resident voters in Hong Kong (who did not have a vote in any other functional constituency), effectively increasing the number of seats elected with universal suffrage to 40.

The pro-Beijing camp scored a major success, maintaining its dominance in the functional constituencies and winning 17 of the 35, nearly half, of the geographical constituency seats, which were considered to be the stronghold of the pan-democracy camp. The Democratic Alliance for the Betterment and Progress of Hong Kong (DAB), the flagship Beijing-loyalist party, won 13 seats in total, more than double the tally of either the pro-democracy Democratic Party or Civic Party, or of its sister organisation, the Hong Kong Federation of Trade Unions (FTU), which each won six seats.

The Democratic Party, the flagship pro-democracy party, suffered the worst defeat since its creation in 1994, winning only six seats and lost all its seats in the New Territories West, while the radical democrats League of Social Democrats and the newly formed People Power doubled their total votes. Despite the addition of five new geographical constituency seats, the pan-democrats won one seat fewer than in the 2008 election; infighting within the camp was blamed. The Civic Party failed in their election strategy as two of their incumbents, Audrey Eu and Tanya Chan, placed second on the lists in Hong Kong Island and New Territories West both received over 70,000 votes, far more than other lists, but still unable to get re-elected.

The pro-business Liberal Party's chairwoman Miriam Lau failed to gain a seat in Hong Kong Island, winning the least seat in party history although James Tien regained his seat in New Territories East. Both Miriam Lau from the Liberals and Albert Ho from the Democrats resigned their seats as chairs after the defeat.

The pan-democracy and pro-Beijing camps both placed three lists in contest of the five new District Council (Second) functional constituency seats. Three of them went to the Democrats Albert Ho and James To and Frederick Fung from the Association for Democracy and People's Livelihood (ADPL). The Beijing-loyalists could only win two seats with FTU's Chan Yuen-han and DAB's Starry Lee each got one seat. Veteran Lau Kong-wah became the only DAB candidate who was placed first on a candidate list but lost in the election.

Eligibility

Right to vote
As at 9 September 2012, a person has the right to vote in a Legislative Council election if he/she fulfils all of the below criteria :
 Hong Kong permanent resident (regardless of nationality),
 ordinarily resides in Hong Kong, 
 holds a Hong Kong identity card or another identity document,
 has registered to vote on or before 16 May 2012, 
 aged 18 or above on 25 July 2012,
 not a member of any armed forces nor found to be incapable under the Mental Health Ordinance (Cap. 136), by reason of mental incapacity, of managing and administering his/her property and affairs.

Right to stand
To stand as a candidate in a geographical constituency, a person must fulfil all of the below criteria:
 a Hong Kong permanent resident with Chinese citizenship, 
 does not have any foreign citizenship nor the right of abode in any country outside China, 
 aged 21 or above on the date of nomination, 
 a registered voter on the date of nomination, 
 has ordinarily resided in Hong Kong for the 3 years immediately preceding the date of nomination, 
 not a member of any national, regional or municipal legislature, assembly or council of any place outside Hong Kong, other than a people's congress or people's consultative body of the People's Republic of China, whether established at the national or local level, 
 not a member of any armed forces nor found to be incapable under the Mental Health Ordinance (Cap. 136), by reason of mental incapacity, of managing and administering his/her property and affairs, 
 submits a nomination form to the returning officer on or before 31 July 2012.

New structure of the Legislative Council

Geographical constituencies
Under the constitutional reform package passed in 2010, this election saw LegCo increase its total size from 60 seats to 70 seats, half of which are geographical constituencies (GCs) and half functional constituencies (FCs). The GC seats are returned by universal suffrage, with the Kowloon West constituency once again returning five seats, while the Hong Kong Island, Kowloon East, and New Territories West constituencies each gain one new seat and New Territories East, the second largest constituency, gaining two extra seats. The election uses a system of party-list proportional representation, with seats allocated by the largest remainder method using the Hare quota as the quota for election.

Functional constituencies

While the electoral methods in the 30 'traditional' FC seats remain unchanged, the five new seats form a new constituency called the District Council, for which candidates may be nominated by the District councillors and are elected by all registered voters who are not in any 'traditional' FC, creating the largest constituency with a total of more than 3.2 million eligible electors. The vote counting system used is the same as that in the GCs: the party-list proportional representation with the largest remainder method and Hare quota.

Retiring incumbents
Thirteen incumbents chose not to run for re-election. Paul Chan's Accountancy seat was vacant since 29 July 2012 and Chim Pui-chung withdrew his nomination on 27 July 2012.

Pre-election issues

New leadership under Leung Chun-ying

As Leung Chun-ying sworn in on 1 July, he sought a foothold in the Legislative Council against his defeated rival, Henry Tang. The Tang supporter for the Financial Services functional constituency, Chim Pui-chung, decided to withdraw his nomination for re-election on 27 July, while Christopher Cheung Wah-fung, who voted for CY Leung and was also a member of the Chinese People's Political Consultative Conference, decided to run in the constituency.

Other Leung's supporters including Martin Liao Cheung-kong, Ng Leung-sing and Ma Fung-kwok also ran in other functional constituencies, replacing the original pro-Tang legislators Philip Wong, David Li and Timothy Fok.

On the day CY Leung assumed the Chief Executive, there were about 400,000 participants in the July 1 marches, the biggest anti-government rally in recent history.

Moral and National Education controversy

Moral and civic education was one of the four key tasks in the 2001 curriculum reform undertaken by the Education and Manpower Bureau (superseded by the Education Bureau in 2007), and its framework was revised by the Education Bureau in 2008. On 13 October 2010, Chief Executive Donald Tsang stated in the "Policy Address 2010–2011" that moral and national education would replace MCE to "strengthen national education". The government planned to introduce the new subject in primary schools in 2012 and secondary schools in 2013.

In July 2012, the "Civil Alliance Against the National Education" (民間反對國民教育科大聯盟) was formed. On 29 July 2012, 30 organisations protested in a march. According to the organisers, more than 90,000 protesters, including many parents with their children, participated in the march.

Members of the student activist group Scholarism (學民思潮) began their occupation of the Hong Kong government headquarters on 30 August 2012. Fifty members occupied the public park beneath the government offices, of which three began a hunger strike. The goal of the protest was, expressly, to force the government to retract its plans to introduce Moral and National Education as a compulsory subject. The initial planned length of the occupation was three days. On 3 September 2012 the Civil Alliance Against National Education announced that they would continue their occupation of the government headquarters indefinitely. On 7 September, up to 120,000 people attended a demonstration outside the government headquarters; police said there were 36,000 attendees at 9:30 pm.

Following opposition from the public, the government postponed the commencement of the subject by introducing a three-year trial run period, such that the schools were allowed to commence the latest in 2015.

Opinion polling

Results

The election was marked with the record of 287 candidates. 67 lists with a total of 216 candidates contested the 35 geographical constituencies, while 53 candidates contested in the traditional functional constituencies, in which 16 of them returned to LegCo uncontested.

The largest pro-democracy party, the Democratic Party, suffered the largest  defeat since its creation in 1994, while the radical democrats League of Social Democrats and the newly formed People Power doubled their votes. Despite the addition of five new geographical constituency seats, the pan-democrats won one seat fewer than in the 2008 poll; infighting within the camp was blamed.
Audrey Eu and Tanya Chan, the incumbent Civic Party legislators, placed second on the lists in Hong Kong Island and New Territories West both received over 70,000 votes, far more than other lists, but still were not re-elected. (see 2012 Hong Kong legislative election in Hong Kong Island and New Territories West)

The Beijing-loyalist Democratic Alliance for the Betterment and Progress of Hong Kong remained the largest party, winning 13 seats in total. All the lists in the geographical constituencies were elected as they split their candidates into several lists to avoid wasting votes under the largest remainder method. Christopher Chung revealed the DAB, of which he is a member, had secretly engaged in illegally allocating votes with the FTU based on the results of the party's own exit polling results; he said that both he and Jasper Tsang switched over to campaigning for the Wong Kwok-hing of the FTU at around 6 pm, after the DAB had reached their quota of vote.

Following the election, Albert Ho, resigned as leader of the Democratic Party, citing failure to present a united front for the pan-democratic camp, failure to retain seats from the previous elections, and infighting between pro-democracy parties. Miriam Lau, the leader of the Liberal Party, also resigned as leader, citing her failure to win a seat in this election and a need for new leadership in the party.

Nine of the 16 uncontested functional constituency seats went to the Liberal Party, Economic Synergy and nonpartisan Lam Tai-fai from the "Tang camp", who are mostly the business and commercial sectors.

Leung's supporters took several seats in the functional constituencies. Pro-Leung Lo Wai-kwok defeated incumbent Raymond Ho Chung-tai who nominated Henry Tang in the CE election and pro-democrat Albert Lai in the Engineering sector. In Tourism, Architectural, Surveying and Planning and Sports, Performing Arts, Culture and Publication constituencies, Yiu Si-wing, Tony Tse Wai-chuen and Ma Fung-kwok were also elected. Leung's backers Ng Leung-sing and Martin Liao Cheung-kong won seats unopposed to the finance and Commercial (Second) functional constituencies respectively.

The acting president of the Hong Kong Professional Teachers' Union Ip Kin-yuen and Civic Party Dennis Kwok retained their seats in the traditionally pro-democracy Education and Legal sectors. Cheung Kwok-che of the Labour Party and nonpartisan Joseph Lee Kok-long also secured their seats in the Social Welfare and Health Services constituencies. In addition, the pan democrats gained two more seats in Information Technology and Accountancy with newcomers Charles Mok and Kenneth Leung.

The pan-democrats won three out of five seats in the new District Council (Second) functional constituency with Albert Ho and James To from the Democratic Party and Frederick Fung from the Association for Democracy and People's Livelihood. The Beijing loyalists could only won two seats with Chan Yuen-han of Hong Kong Federation of Trade Unions (FTU) and Starry Lee of the Democratic Alliance for the Betterment of Hong Kong (DAB) each got one seat. Veteran Lau Kong-wah became the only DAB candidate who was placed first on a candidate list but lost in the election (see 2012 Hong Kong legislative election in District Council).

Election results overall 

Before election:

Change in composition:

|- style="text-align:center;"
! style="background-color:#E9E9E9" class="unsortable" width="4" rowspan=2|
! style="background-color:#E9E9E9" class="unsortable" rowspan=2|
! style="background-color:#E9E9E9;text-align:center;" rowspan=2|Political affiliation
! style="background-color:#E9E9E9;text-align:right;" colspan=4 |Geographical Constituencies
! style="background-color:#E9E9E9;text-align:right;" colspan=4 |Traditional Functional Constituencies
! style="background-color:#E9E9E9;text-align:right;" colspan=3 |District Council (Second) FC
! style="background-color:#E9E9E9;text-align:right;" rowspan=2|Totalseats
! style="background-color:#E9E9E9;text-align:right;" rowspan=2|±
|-
! style="background-color:#E9E9E9;text-align:right;" data-sort-type="number" |Votes
! style="background-color:#E9E9E9;text-align:right;" data-sort-type="number" |%
! style="background-color:#E9E9E9;text-align:right;" |±pp
! style="background-color:#E9E9E9;text-align:right;" data-sort-type="number" |Seats
! style="background-color:#E9E9E9;text-align:right;" data-sort-type="number" |Votes
! style="background-color:#E9E9E9;text-align:right;" data-sort-type="number" |%
! style="background-color:#E9E9E9;text-align:right;" |±pp
! style="background-color:#E9E9E9;text-align:right;" data-sort-type="number" |Seats
! style="background-color:#E9E9E9;text-align:right;" data-sort-type="number" |Votes
! style="background-color:#E9E9E9;text-align:right;" data-sort-type="number" |%
! style="background-color:#E9E9E9;text-align:right;" data-sort-type="number" |Seats
|-
| rowspan=11 style="background-color:Pink;border-bottom-style:hidden;" |
| 
| 366,140 || 20.22 || 2.70 || 9 || 105 || 0.07 || 0.14 || 3 || 476,875 || 29.96 || 1 || 13 || 3
|-
| 
| 127,857 || 7.06 || 1.36 || 3 || - || - || - || 2 || 246,196 || 15.47 || 1 || 6 || 2
|-
| 
| 48,702 || 2.69 || 1.64 || 1 || 1,076 || 0.76 || 2.58 || 4 || - || - || - || 5 || 2
|-
| 
| 5,717 || 0.32 || N/A || 0 || - || - || - || 3 || - || - || - || 3 || 1
|-
| 
| 68,097 || 3.76 || N/A || 2 || - || - || - || - || - || - || - || 2 || 1
|-
| 
| 34,548 || 1.91 || N/A || 1 || - || - || - || - || - || - || - || 1 || 0
|-
| 
| - || - || - || - || 1,106 || 0.78 || N/A || 1 || - || - || - || 1 || 1
|-
| 
| - || - || - || - || - || - || - || 1 || - || - || - || 1 || 0
|-
|  
| 23,988 || 1.32 || N/A || 0 || - || - || - || - || - || - || - || 0 || 0
|-
| style="background-color:#ED6C10;" |
| style="text-align:left;" | Third Force
| 16,767 || 0.93 || N/A || 0 || - || - || - || - || - || - || - || 0 || 0
|-
| style="background-color:#DDDDDD;" |
| style="text-align:left;" | Pro-Beijing Independents
| 80,671 || 4.45 || - || 1 || 44,529|| 31.36 || N/A || 10 || 61,321 || 3.85 || 0 || 11 || 2
|-class="sortbottom" style="background-color:Pink" 
| colspan=3 style="text-align:left;" | Total for pro-Beijing camp
|  772,487 || 42.66 || 2.91 || 17 || 46,816 || 32.97 || 1.91 || 24 || 784,392 || 49.28 || 2 || 43 || 6
|-
| rowspan=11 style="background-color:LightGreen;border-bottom-style:hidden;" |
| 
| 255,007 || 14.08 || 0.42 || 5 || 4,480 || 3.15 || 4.36 || 1 || - || - || - || 6 || 1
|-
| 
| 247,220 || 13.65 || 6.98 || 4 || 1,464 || 1.03 || 1.80 || 0 || 545,308 || 34.26 || 2 || 6 || 2
|-
| 
| 112,140 || 6.19 || N/A || 3 || 9,078 || 6.39 || N/A || 1 || - || - || - || 4 || 1
|-
| 
| 176,250 || 9.73 || N/A || 3 || - || - || - || - || - || - || - || 3 || 1
|-
| 
| 87,997 || 4.86 || 5.26 || 1 || - || - || - || - || - || - || - || 1 || 0
|-
| 
| 43,799 || 2.42 || 0.38 || 1 || - || - || - || - || - || - || - || 1 || 0
|-
| 
| 30,634 || 1.69 || 1.10|| 0 || - || - || - || - || 262,172 || 16.47 || 1 || 1 || 0
|-
| 
| 28,621 || 1.58 || N/A || 1 || - || - || - || - || - || - || - || 1 || 1
|-
| 
|  - || - || - || - || 46,535 || 32.77 || 1.80 || 1 || - || - || - || 1 || 0
|-
| 
| 2,896 || 0.16 || N/A || 0  || - || - || - || - || - || - || - || 0 || 0
|-
| style="background-color:#DDDDDD;" |
| style="text-align:left;" | Independent democrats
| 33,988 || 1.87 || - || 0 || 26,892 || 18.94 || N/A || 3 || - || - || - || 3 || -
|-class="sortbottom" style="background-color:LightGreen"
| colspan=3 style="text-align:left;" | Total for pan-democrats
|  1,018,552 || 56.24 || 3.26 || 18 || 88,449 || 62.28 || 1.66 || 6 || 807,480 || 50.73 || 3 || 27 ||  4
|-style="background-color:#E9E9E9"
|| || || style="text-align:left;" | Non-aligned others
| 19,945 || 1.10 || - || 0 || 2,205 || 1.55 || 6.77 || 0 || - || - || 0 || 0 || -
|- class="sortbottom"
|colspan=3 style="background-color:#E9E9E9" | Total || style="background-color:#E9E9E9"| 1,810,984   || style="background-color:#E9E9E9"| 100.00 || style="background-color:#E9E9E9"| || style="background-color:#E9E9E9"| 35 || style="background-color:#E9E9E9"| 142,011   || style="background-color:#E9E9E9"| 100.00 || style="background-color:#E9E9E9"| || style="background-color:#E9E9E9"| 30 || style="background-color:#E9E9E9"| 1,591,872 || style="background-color:#E9E9E9"| 100.00 || style="background-color:#E9E9E9" | 5 || style="background-color:#E9E9E9" | 70 || style="background-color:#E9E9E9" | 
|- class="sortbottom"
| colspan="16" style="background-color:#E9E9E9"|
|- class="sortbottom"
|colspan=3 style="background-color:#E9E9E9" | Valid votes || style="background-color:#E9E9E9"| 1,810,984   || style="background-color:#E9E9E9"| 98.49 || style="background-color:#E9E9E9"| 0.93 || style="background-color:#E9E9E9" rowspan=4 | || style="background-color:#E9E9E9"| 142,011 || style="background-color:#E9E9E9"| 93.97 || style="background-color:#E9E9E9"| 1.59 || style="background-color:#E9E9E9" rowspan=4| || style="background-color:#E9E9E9"| 1,591,872 || style="background-color:#E9E9E9"| 95.16 || style="background-color:#E9E9E9" rowspan=4 colspan=3| 
|- class="sortbottom"
|colspan=3 style="background-color:#E9E9E9" | Invalid votes || style="background-color:#E9E9E9"| 27,738  || style="background-color:#E9E9E9"| 1.51 || style="background-color:#E9E9E9"| 0.93 || style="background-color:#E9E9E9"| 9,113  || style="background-color:#E9E9E9"| 6.03 || style="background-color:#E9E9E9"| 1.59 || style="background-color:#E9E9E9"| 80,921 || style="background-color:#E9E9E9"| 4.84
|- class="sortbottom"
|colspan=3 style="background-color:#E9E9E9"|Vote cast / turnout || style="background-color:#E9E9E9"|  1,838,722  || style="background-color:#E9E9E9"| 53.05 || style="background-color:#E9E9E9"| 7.85 || style="background-color:#E9E9E9"|  151,124  || style="background-color:#E9E9E9"| 69.65 || style="background-color:#E9E9E9"| 9.35 || style="background-color:#E9E9E9"| 1,672,793 || style="background-color:#E9E9E9"| 51.95
|- class="sortbottom"
|colspan=3 style="background-color:#E9E9E9"|Registered voters || style="background-color:#E9E9E9"|  3,466,201  || style="background-color:#E9E9E9"| 100.00 || style="background-color:#E9E9E9"| 2.79 || style="background-color:#E9E9E9"|  216,979  || style="background-color:#E9E9E9"| 100.00 || style="background-color:#E9E9E9"| 2.24 || style="background-color:#E9E9E9"| 3,219,755 || style="background-color:#E9E9E9"| 100.00
|}

Election results by Geographical Constituency

Votes gained by each party by districts

Votes summary

Seats summary

Incumbents defeated
Twelve incumbents were not re-elected.

Candidates lists and results

Geographical Constituencies (35 seats)
Voting system: Party-list proportional representation with largest remainder method and Hare quota.

District Council (Second) Functional Constituency (5 seats)
Voting system: Party-list proportional representation with largest remainder method and Hare quota.

Other Functional Constituencies (30 seats)
Voting systems: Different voting systems apply to different functional constituencies, namely for the Heung Yee Kuk, Agriculture and Fisheries, Insurance and Transport, the preferential elimination system of voting; and for the remaining 24 FCs used the first-past-the-post voting system.

See also
Legislative Council of Hong Kong
Hong Kong legislative elections
2008 Hong Kong legislative election

References

External links
Legislative Council of Hong Kong
2012 Electoral Affairs Commission

 
L
2012 in Hong Kong
Legislative Council of Hong Kong
September 2012 events in China